The Easton Diversion Dam is a diversion dam on the Yakima River In western Kittitas County near Easton, Washington.

Construction of the dam began in 1928 and was completed the next year. It is currently owned by the Bureau of Reclamation and operated by the Kittitas Reclamation District.

See also
List of dams in the Columbia River watershed

References

Dams in Washington (state)
Dams on the Yakima River
Buildings and structures in Kittitas County, Washington
United States Bureau of Reclamation dams
Dams completed in 1929